The Billboard India Songs is a record chart in India for songs. It has been compiled by Billboard and Luminate since February 2022. The chart is updated every Wednesday at Billboard.com (UTC). The chart consists of 25 songs.

The first number-one song on the chart was "295" by Sidhu Moose Wala on the issue dated July 27, 2021. The current number-one on the chart as of the issue dated June 3rd, 2022 is Last Ride by Sidhu Moose Wala

Methodology 
The chart tracks songs' performance from Friday to Thursday and is made available on Tuesday morning. The chart includes 25 songs, ranked based on streaming data and digital sales provided by MRC Data.

Artist achievements

Most number-one singles

Most weeks at number one

Most single-week entries

Song milestones

Most weeks at number one

List of number-one songs

See also 
 Hits of the World
 IMI International Top 20 Singles

References

External links 
 

Record charts